Domenico Mennitti (11 August 1939 – 6 April 2014) was an Italian journalist and politician from the Italian Social Movement.  He served as Vice-Secretary of his party and as a member of the Chamber of Deputies during three legislatures (1979–1991) and was also a Member of the European Parliament (MEP) from 1999 to 2004.

After leaving the European Parliament, Mennitti served as Mayor (síndaco) of Brindisi from 13 June 2004 to 31 August 2011.

References

1939 births
2014 deaths
People from the Province of Campobasso
Italian Social Movement politicians
Forza Italia politicians
Deputies of Legislature VIII of Italy
Deputies of Legislature IX of Italy
Deputies of Legislature X of Italy
Mayors of Brindisi
MEPs for Italy 1999–2004
Politicians of Molise
Italian journalists
Italian male journalists